The 2013–14 Canberra United FC season is the club's sixth participation in the W-League, since the league's and club's formation in 2008.

Season overview

Players

Squad information

Transfers in

Transfers out

Technical staff

Squad statistics

Disciplinary record

Goal scorers

Competitions

Overall

W-League

League table

Results summary

Results by round

Matches

W-League Finals series

Awards
 Player of the Week (Round 2) - Michelle Heyman
 Player of the Week (Round 10) - Kendall Fletcher

References

External links
 Official Website

Canberra United FC seasons
Canberra